We Might As Well Be Dead is a 2022 German-Romanian drama and social satire film directed by Natalia Sinelnikova, starring Ioana Iacob and Pola Geiger.

Cast
Ioana Iacob as Anna Wilczynska
Pola Geiger as Iris Anna Wilczynska
 Jörg Schüttauf as Gerti
 Şiir Eloğlu as Ursel

Release
Fortissimo Films acquired the international rights to the film in January 2022. The film premiered at the Berlin International Film Festival on 11 February 2022.

Reception
Chase Hutchinson of Collider rated the film an "A". Sharai Bohannon of Dread Central rated the film 3.5 stars out of 5, writing, "It’s a fine film that provides a couple of laughs and plays on that mistrust of our neighbors that most of us have. It flirts with a few different genres before deciding to keep it light." The film received positive reviews in ScreenAnarchy and Screen International.

References

External links
 
 

German drama films
Romanian drama films
2022 drama films
2022 films